The Shogun Warriors were the main characters of a line of toys licensed by Mattel Inc. during the late 1970s. They were a series of imported Japanese toys based on several anime and tokusatsu shows featuring giant robots. They were originally manufactured in three sizes:  plastic versions,  die-cast metal versions, and slightly taller but much more detailed 5-inch (127 mm) die-cast versions. Several vehicles were also offered, as well as a set that could be put together to form the super robot Combattra. Toward the end of production, Mattel proposed the inclusion of plastic toy vehicles for the 3.5" figures to ride in exclusively in the United States, but these toys were never released for purchase.

Features
The toys featured spring-loaded launcher weapons such as missiles, shuriken and battle axes. Some were able to launch their fists, while the later die-cast versions also had the ability to transform into different shapes. Raydeen, for example, could become a birdlike spaceship. These "convertible" versions were the precursors to the Transformers line of toy robots, but unlike the Transformers, minor disassembling was usually required to transform the robots. There was even a robot named Megatron in issue #18 of the Shogun Warriors comic book series, a name subsequently used multiple times for the leader of the evil Decepticons from the Transformers series. Sometimes the toys were unable to transform into their second form, one example being Gaiking's "giant skull", which was the head for Daiku Maryu, a space dragon toy released under the Shogun Warriors line as "Kargosaur".

Several of the anime-based toys from this toy line reappeared in the 1980s in Jim Terry's Force Five series. A single movie version was edited from each series and sold on home video. These features aired on the Showtime cable network in 1981 under the name Force Five.

Toy line
Giant robot characters that featured in the original toy line were:

Robot-17 (called Daitetsujin 17 in Japan)
Combattra (called Combattler V in Japan)
Dynamo (called Daimos in Japan)
Danguard Ace 
Dragun (called Getter Dragon in Japan)
Gaiking
Grandizer (called Grendizer in Japan)
Great Mazinga (called Great Mazinger in Japan)
Leopardon
Poseidon (called Getter Poseidon in Japan)
Raider (called Getter Liger in Japan and Arrow in Force Five TV series)
Raideen
Voltes V

In addition, two giant movie monsters from Toho were added to the line:
Godzilla
Rodan

Some Super Sentai toys were also adapted for the line.

Controversy
Similarly to other toy lines during the 1970s, the Shogun Warriors toys came under pressure over safety concerns regarding their spring-loaded weapons. The concern was that children might launch the weapons and hit other children or pets in the eyes. There was also a risk that small children might choke on the small plastic missiles and other parts. Toy manufacturers then faced new regulations as a result of reported injuries received while playing with these toys. Consequently, many toy companies were forced to remodel existing toy lines with child-safe variations such as spring-loaded "action" missiles that would remain attached to the toy. Because of this, as well as declining sales, the Shogun Warrior toy line was discontinued by 1980.

Comics
The Shogun Warriors characters were licensed by Marvel Comics to create a comic book series written by Doug Moench and drawn by Herb Trimpe. The series (composed of 20 issues) was published from February 1979 to September 1980. In the comic book series, the Shogun Warriors were created by a mysterious group called the Followers of the Light and human operators were chosen from all around the world to operate the massive robots in order to battle evil.

Marvel only licensed three Shogun Warriors characters for the comic book series:  
Raydeen, piloted by Richard Carson, an American stuntman.
Combatra, piloted by Genji Odashu, a Japanese test pilot.
Dangard Ace, piloted by Ilongo Savage, an oceanographer from Madagascar.

Shogun Warriors #15 (April 1980) was a fill-in written by Steven Grant with art by Mike Vosburg. The series took a dramatic turn with Shogun Warriors #16 (May 1980), as the Shogun Warriors' mentors were destroyed by the Primal One and his followers. This alien force decided that Earth's technology had outpaced its morality, making it their duty to destroy the Shogun Warriors as well as other powerful humans, including Reed Richards and Tony Stark. Declining sales, as well as Moench's commitment to writing the Moon Knight comic book series that had just been started, led Marvel to cancel the Shogun Warriors comic book series. After Marvel lost the rights to the characters, the Samurai Destroyer (a giant robot built from the pieces of an abandoned fourth robot that was never finished) destroy the other three giant robots off-panel, before encountering the Fantastic Four and the robots' pilots Richard, Genji and Ilongo.

Between February and July 1979, Marvel had the comic book rights to both Godzilla and the Shogun Warriors. While the characters never crossed paths in their respective comics, Trimpe (who did the artwork for both of the series) drew a variation of Godzilla and Rodan alongside Daimos, Great Mazinger, Raydeen and Gaiking on the top page of a comic book advertisement soliciting the Shogun Warrior toys. Mattel simultaneously had a license to produce Shogun Warriors toys (at the time) and a licence to produce toys based on Godzilla and Rodan. Though never appearing in the comic series, Red Ronin of Marvel's Godzilla, King of the Monsters comic book series was mentioned occasionally and was frequently written about in the letters pages.

In popular culture
Several Shogun Warriors appeared in the Wonder Woman episode, "The Deadly Toys" at a toy shop run by Frank Gorshin.  Raideen and Goldorak appear briefly in the collection of Edouard Valéras (Michel Beaune) in the 1981 film, The Professional.

Revival
In 2010, Toynami revived the Shogun Warriors name with a new toy line, consisting of  Jumbo Machinder toys. The first two robots in this line were GoLion and Dairugger XV, both of which were adapted in the Western world as Voltron.

References

External links
 1979 Mattel Catalog at Plaidstallions.com
 Toynami's official Shogun Warriors page
 
 Shogun Warriors at the Unofficial Handbook of Marvel Comics Creators
 Wildtoys Shogun Warriors Fan Page (English)
 Shogun Warrior vs. Godzilla commercial 1970s at YouTube

1970s toys
1979 comics debuts
1980 comics endings
2010s toys
Comics based on toys
Comics by Doug Moench
Defunct American comics
Godzilla (franchise)
Japanese die-cast toys
Marvel Comics robots
Marvel Comics titles
Mattel
Robot comics
Super robot anime and manga

ja:超合金 (玩具)